The  Washington Valor season was the franchise's inaugural season and the city of Washington's first Arena Football League season since the Washington Commandos left in 1990. The Valor played their home games at the Verizon Center.

The Valor won their first-ever season game against the Baltimore Brigade 51–38 on April 7, 2017. Head coach Dean Cokinos, who previously coached the New Orleans VooDoo, led the Valor.

Staff

Final roster

Schedule

Regular season
The 2017 regular season schedule was released on January 5, 2017.

Standings

References

Washington Valor
Washington Valor seasons
Washington Valor
Washington Valor